The 2016 Poznań Open was a professional tennis tournament played on clay courts. It was the thirteenth edition of the tournament which was part of the 2016 ATP Challenger Tour. It took place at the Park Tenisowy Olimpia in Poznań, Poland from 9 to 11 July 2015, including the qualifying competition in the first two days.

For the first time in the tournament's history, evening sessions under floodlights were scheduled on rebuild centre court. The prize money has decreased to €42,500 + Hospitality, and because of calendar congestion caused by the 2016 Summer Olympics no top 100 player entered that year, which had not happened in Poznań Open before. However, when the tournament started, a top seeded Radu Albot was ranked 92.

Due to bad weather, some of the first round doubles matches were played indoors.

Singles main-draw entrants

Seeds

Other entrants
The following players received wildcards into the singles main draw:
  Victor Vlad Cornea
  Michał Dembek
  Hubert Hurkacz
  Kamil Majchrzak

The following players received entry from the qualifying draw:
  Marcin Gawron
  Clément Geens
  Pedro Sousa
  Tak Khunn Wang

The following player entered as lucky losers:
  Sergey Betov
  Maxime Janvier

Withdrawals
During the tournament
  Antal van der Duim
  Aslan Karatsev

Doubles main-draw entrants

Seeds

Other entrants
The following pairs received wildcards into the doubles main draw:
  Victor-Mugurel Anagnastopol /  Victor Vlad Cornea
  Michał Dembek /  Grzegorz Panfil
  Piotr Matuszewski /  Kacper Żuk

The following pair received entry from the qualifying draw:
  Hubert Hurkacz /  Jan Zieliński

The following pair received entry as a lucky losers into the singles main draw:
  Marcin Gawron /  Adam Majchrowicz

Champions

Singles

  Radu Albot def.  Clément Geens, 6–2, 6–4

Doubles

  Aleksandre Metreveli /  Peng Hsien-yin def.  Mateusz Kowalczyk /  Kamil Majchrzak, 6–4, 3–6, [10–8]

Notes

References

External links
Official Website
ATP Challenger Tour

Poznań Open
Poznań Open
Poz